Richard Cotton may refer to:

Richard Lynch Cotton (1794–1880), British vicar and academic administrator
Sir Richard Cotton (in or before 1497–1556), courtier in the court of Henry VIII of England
Richard Cotton (geneticist) (1940–2015), Australian medical researcher
Richard Cotton (politician), Western Australian politician and educator 
Rick Cotton, executive director of the Port Authority of New York and New Jersey